Astros de Jalisco (English: Jalisco Astros) is a professional Mexican basketball team, based in Guadalajara, Jalisco. The Astros are part the CIBACOPA and the Liga Nacional de Baloncesto Profesional, the top professional basketball league in Mexico. The team plays its home games at the Arena Astros, with a capacity of 4,000 spectators.

History
The Astros were presented in February 2019 as a joint effort between the government of the State of Jalisco and Grupo Multimedios, a media conglomerate.

The Astros were one of the three new teams that debuted in the 2019–20 LNBP season, the other two were the Dorados de Chihuahua and the Plateros de Fresnillo.

On July 12, 2022, Astros won its first CIBACOPA championship in its debut season in the league, after beating Rayos de Hermosillo 91–87 in the sixth game of the final. The Astros' American guard Javion Blake was named the Finals MVP.

Honours 
CIBACOPA

 Champions (1): 2022

Players

Current roster

References

External links
 Team profile 

Basketball teams in Mexico
Sports teams in Guadalajara, Jalisco
Basketball teams established in 2019
2019 establishments in Mexico